Maia (born July 9, 2000), known professionally as mxmtoon, is an American singer-songwriter and YouTuber. Her music is characterized by emotionally transparent, confessional lyrics, and often employs the ukulele. She released her first EP, Plum Blossom, in 2018; her debut album, The Masquerade, was released in September 2019. This was followed by the twin EPs Dawn and Dusk in 2020, and second studio album Rising, which was released on May 20, 2022.

Maia began self-releasing songs in secret in 2017, before the size of her online presence became too substantial to conceal. In addition to involvement with music, Maia is a streamer on Twitch, has made a podcast, and has released two graphic novels. She has collaborated with artists such as Cavetown and Chloe Moriondo, and resides in Brooklyn, New York City.

Early life 
Maia was born on July 9, 2000, in Oakland, California; she grew up near Lake Merritt. Her mother is Chinese-American, and her father is German and Scottish. While at school, she enjoyed taking art and architecture classes. She became interested in music from a young age; her brother took violin lessons, and in first grade, Maia joined him. A few years later, she began playing classical cello and trumpet.

In fifth grade, she auditioned for her school rock band. Expecting to audition for cello, she was instead asked to sing Oasis' song "Wonderwall," and ended up joining as a vocalist, where she recalls singing "The Middle" by Jimmy Eat World. In sixth grade, she began playing guitar, learning in part from her father.

Maia first coined the name "mxmtoon" on her Instagram account, where she drew cartoon sketches. She started a YouTube channel in September 2013, and began playing the ukulele in middle school. She wrote her first song at age 13.

Career

2017–2018: Plum Blossom
Maia began self-releasing songs on YouTube under the online alias "mxmtoon" in 2017; the name is derived from her initials. Although she started her career secretly, subsequent growth of her online presence compelled her to disclose her activity in this field to her family. Her early oeuvre was recorded with GarageBand in her parents' guest bedroom, and percussion tracks were created with found objects such as hair straighteners. After initially attempting to write comedy songs, she began writing in a confessional style.

Her 2017 collaboration with lo-fi producer Peachy, "Falling for U," became an early signature song; it has since garnered more than three hundred million streams on Spotify. In 2018, Maia released her debut EP, Plum Blossom; It was accompanied by the "Plum Blossom Tour," scheduled for the March of the following year. While it was initially scheduled for five US shows with fellow Californian singer-songwriter Khai Dreams in March 2019, it sold out and was extended to include additional concerts in North America and Europe, including opening appearances for bedroom pop YouTuber Cavetown.

After high school, Maia took a gap year by postponing college to focus on her music. She was planning to study architecture after graduating from high school, until her music went viral in April 2018.

2019–2021: The Masquerade, Dawn, and Dusk 

Maia's debut studio album, The Masquerade, was released on September 17, 2019; the album peaked at number 45 on the US Indie Albums Chart. "Prom Dress," the lead single, found considerable usage on social media platform TikTok, where it has been used in over a hundred thousand videos. The album's release had been accompanied by 21 Days, a podcast in audio diary format by Spotify that concerned Maia's activities while working on the project in New York City. To support the album, Maia embarked on The Masquerade Tour, of North America and United Kingdom, in the same month of the album's release. Her first graphic novel, The Adventures Of mxmtoon: The Masquerade, began selling in October 2019.

In the succeeding month, Maia signed to the label of Kobalt Music Group, under a global publishing deal. She released a remix album, The Masquerade (The Edits) soon after, and recorded "Prom Dress" in Simlish, the fictional language used in The Sims games.

Maia released her first single of 2020, "Fever Dream," in January. "Fever Dream" was followed by EP Dawn in April; accompanying EP Dusk was released in October. In an interview given in the interregnum between the releases of the two EPs, Maia detailed an intention to make music that "gracefully said thank you and goodbye" to her past work. Dawn and Dusk were soon amalgamated to form album Dawn & Dusk; in the meantime, she also started a daily history podcast, 365 days with mxmtoon.

Maia was featured in Dork's Hype List of 2020, alongside artists including Girl in Red, Beabadoobee and Maisie Peters. In the March of the following year, she was announced as the singing voice for Alex Chen, the protagonist of the Square Enix game Life Is Strange: True Colors. An accompanying EP entitled True Colors (from Life is Strange) was released concurrently.

2022–present: Rising 

In February 2022, Maia announced a North American tour for her then-upcoming album Rising, entitled "rising (the tour)"; it was indicated that fellow musician Chloe Moriondo would be joining her in concert. She also released "Mona Lisa", which served as the lead single for the album. Further tour dates across the United Kingdom, Europe, and Australasia were announced in the following month, with Ricky Montgomery accompanying her on European and British touring dates.

Rising was released on the twentieth of May, after releases of singles "Sad Disco", "Victim of Nostalgia", and "Coming of Age". A deluxe version followed in September.

Public image

Maia has been credited in NPR criticism as having an "endearingly intimate presence." Her music has been described as "warm folk-pop tunes with acoustic ornamentations," "one part acoustic-pop a-la Kina Grannis, mixed with sharp lyricism and avant-garde, off-kilter melodics akin to Fiona Apple or PJ Harvey," and artistry that "explore[s] themes such as the trials of love, being a burden to those close to you, and connecting with your family's heritage." Joshua Bote of Paste wrote that Maia "might be the songwriter a new generation needs", noting that she is "made for these times" and is "armed with a ukulele, a sardonic charm and social media savvy;" he went on to describe her as "really, really good at the internet."

Grant Rindner of Nylon wrote: "With a commitment to covering topics she rarely hears addressed by other artists, and a keen understanding of how to bond with her audience, she's emerged as a charming and relatable singer-songwriter with a massive platform." After attending Maia's performance at the Gramercy Theatre, Briana Younger of The New Yorker wrote, "She sang of routine high-school problems, such as crippling self-doubt and unrequited love, with an emotional sophistication that reminded us that there are some things we never outgrow." Joe Coscarelli of New York Times compared Maia's bedroom pop style to that of Girl in Red, Clairo and Beabadoobee, as well as the folk-pop "simplicity" of Regina Spektor and The Moldy Peaches; he described her as a character "who overflows with earnestness and giggles", and her rise in popularity as the assemblage of "an independent, D.I.Y. mini-empire almost by accident."

Maia remains active on TikTok, where she has amassed nearly three million followers and 140 million likes, as of January 2023. To date, she has had online presences on Vine, Tumblr, Facebook, Twitch, Snapchat, Bandcamp, Pinterest, and SoundCloud, as well as TikTok. She also streams on Twitch, where she has over two hundred thousand followers.

Artistry

Influences 
Maia has cited Arctic Monkeys, The Black Keys, Sufjan Stevens and Elliott Smith as her influences. She also has credited inspiration from female artists, such as Clairo.

Personal life
Maia identifies as "a young bisexual woman of color from a family of immigrants" and currently lives in Brooklyn, New York, where she writes, records, and produces her own music from her home that she shares with her younger brother. She graduated from high school in 2019. In Maia's youth, her parents played R&B and hip-hop, including Salt-N-Pepa and A Tribe Called Quest, which she still listens to "for nostalgia."

Maia has been diagnosed with premenstrual dysphoric disorder; in 2021, she partnered with Kotex, a brand that sells menstrual hygiene products, to discuss her experience living with the disorder.

Discography

Studio albums

Compilation albums

Extended plays

Singles

As lead artist

As featured artist

Bibliography

Graphic novels 

 The Adventures Of mxmtoon: The Masquerade (with Ellie Black, Self-published, 2019) 
 The Adventures Of mxmtoon: Dawn & Dusk

Awards and nominations

Tours 
Headlining

 Plum Blossom Tour (2019)
 The Masquerade Tour (2019)
 dawn & dusk Tour (Cancelled)
 rising (The Tour) (2022)

Notes

References

External links
 
 

Music YouTubers
Bisexual singers
Bisexual songwriters
Bisexual women
Women video bloggers
Musicians from Oakland, California
American people of Chinese descent
American people of German descent
American people of Scottish descent
21st-century American singers
21st-century American women singers
American women pop singers
American women singer-songwriters
Living people
2000 births
LGBT people from California
American LGBT people of Asian descent
LGBT YouTubers
American TikTokers
American podcasters
American indie pop musicians
Bedroom pop musicians
LGBT TikTokers
American YouTubers
YouTube vloggers
American LGBT singers
American LGBT songwriters
American women podcasters
20th-century LGBT people
21st-century LGBT people
Singer-songwriters from California